Hotel Love, at 200 W. Main St. in Purcell, Oklahoma, was built in 1896.  It was listed on the National Register of Historic Places in 1995.

It has Italianate style.

References

Hotels in Oklahoma
National Register of Historic Places in McClain County, Oklahoma
Italianate architecture in Oklahoma
Buildings and structures completed in 1896